Zhengzhou–Xinzheng Airport intercity railway is a regional higher-speed railway in Zhengzhou, Henan, China. The railway provides Zhengzhou city center fast train connections with Zhengzhou Xinzheng International Airport. It is a component of the larger Central Plain Metropolitan Intercity Rail network. With the opening of the railway, it takes only 19 mins from Zhengzhou East railway station to Xinzheng Airport.

History

The railway opened on 31 December 2015.

Stations
Some trains through operate to  via the Zhengkai ICR or to  via the Zhengjiao ICR.

Rolling stock
CRH2A EMUs had been used for service in the initial operation stage. From February 2018, new CRH6A EMUs have replaced CRH2As for service.

References

High-speed railway lines in China
Rail transport in Henan
Railway lines opened in 2015
Airport rail links in China